Freewheeler is the sixth studio album released by American country music singer David Ball. It was released in 2004 on the independent Wildcatter label. The lead-off single, "Louisiana Melody", charted at #59 on the Billboard country charts in 2004. It was followed by "Happy With the One I've Got" and "Too Much Blood in My Alcohol Level", neither of which charted. The track "I Can See Arkansas" was previously recorded by Steve Wariner on his 1990 album Laredo.

Track listing
"Louisiana Melody" (David Ball, Allen Shamblin) – 2:52
"Happy With the One I've Got" (Wood Newton, Rand Bishop) – 3:21
"Nobody Told Me" (Gary Cotton, John Wiggins) – 2:55
"Tell Me With Your Heart" (Ball, Chris Carmichael) – 4:03
"I Can See Arkansas" (Newton, James Nihan) – 3:27
"Too Much Blood in My Alcohol Level" (Newton, Mark Alan Barnett) – 2:50
"Desert Luau" (Danny Baker) – 3:00
"Mr. Teardrop" (Ball) – 3:46
"Yours Truly Blue" (Ball, Carmichael) – 3:23
"A Girl I Use to Know" (Ball) – 3:21
"Violence and Lies" (Newton) – 3:30
"Freewheeler" (Jesse Winchester) – 4:01

Personnel
 David Ball - lead vocals
 Vince Barranco - drums
 Chris Carmichael - fiddle
 J.T. Corenflos - electric guitar
 Dan Frizsell - bass guitar
 Mike Johnson - pedal steel guitar
 Billy Linneman - bass guitar
 Kim Morrison - background vocals
 Wood Newton - background vocals
 Billy Panda - acoustic guitar, electric guitar, ukulele
 Alison Prestwood - bass guitar
 Mike Rojas - piano
 Milton Sledge - drums
 Jeff Taylor - piano, accordion
 Russell Terrell - background vocals

References
Allmusic (see infobox)

2004 albums
David Ball (country singer) albums